Yutaka Okamoto (born 2 March 1925) was a Japanese sailor. He competed in the Dragon event at the 1960 Summer Olympics.

References

External links
 

1925 births
Possibly living people
Japanese male sailors (sport)
Olympic sailors of Japan
Sailors at the 1960 Summer Olympics – Dragon
Sportspeople from Kanagawa Prefecture